Serhiy Tovstoplet (6 March 1937 – 23 January 2017) was a Ukrainian swimmer. He competed in the men's 4 × 200 metre freestyle relay at the 1960 Summer Olympics for the Soviet Union.

References

External links
 

1937 births
2017 deaths
Ukrainian male swimmers
Olympic swimmers of the Soviet Union
Swimmers at the 1960 Summer Olympics
Sportspeople from Kropyvnytskyi
Soviet male swimmers